Nul Records is an independent record label set up by the post-punk revival band The Futureheads. The label is run by the four members of the Futureheads: Ross Millard, Dave Hyde, Barry Hyde, David "Jaff" Craig, as well as their two managers.

Overview
The Futureheads set up this record label some time after they split with their former record label, 679 Recordings, in late 2006, apparently disliking the direction 679 Recordings was taking them. Other sources, however, say that they were dropped by their record label because of poor sales. Millard, band guitarist and vocalist, also pointed out several shortcomings as the reason they left their label:

With the record label they set up between 2006 and 2008, they started on writing songs and recording them, then finally releasing their third studio album, This Is Not The World, on 26 May 2008 in Britain. All subsequent Futureheads albums were released on Nul Records.

References

External links 

 

British record labels
Indie rock record labels
Alternative rock record labels
The Futureheads